Omoto Station may refer to multiple railway stations in Japan:
 Iwaizumi-Omoto Station (formerly named Omoto Station) in Iwate Prefecture
 Ōmoto Station in Okayama Prefecture